CCTL may refer to:

 Common Criteria Testing Laboratory
 Command Completion Time Limit